Consuelo Changanaqui (born 7 September 1951) is a Peruvian former freestyle and medley swimmer. She competed in four events at the 1968 Summer Olympics.

References

External links
 

1951 births
Living people
Peruvian female freestyle swimmers
Peruvian female medley swimmers
Olympic swimmers of Peru
Swimmers at the 1968 Summer Olympics
People from Piura Region